Pandy is a small village in Powys, Wales located off the main A470 road near Llanbrynmair.

Villages in Powys